Spiezio is a surname. Notable people with the surname include:

Ed Spiezio (born 1941), American baseball player
Scott Spiezio (born 1972), American baseball player